"Free Bird", also spelled "Freebird", is a song written by  Allen Collins and Ronnie Van Zant and performed by American rock band Lynyrd Skynyrd. The song featured on the band's debut album in 1973.

Released as a single in November 1974, "Free Bird" entered the Billboard Hot 100 on November 23 at No. 87
and became the band's second Top 40 hit in early 1975, peaking at No. 19 on January 25.
A live version of the song reentered the charts in late 1976,
eventually peaking at No. 38 in January 1977.

"Free Bird" achieved the No. 8 spot on Guitar Worlds 100 Greatest Guitar Solos. It is Lynyrd Skynyrd's signature song, the finale during live performances, and their longest song, often going well over 14 minutes when played live.

Origins 
According to guitarist Gary Rossington, for two years after Allen Collins wrote the initial chords, vocalist Ronnie Van Zant insisted that there were too many for him to create a melody in the belief that the melody needed to change alongside the chords.  After Collins played the unused sequence at rehearsal one day, Van Zant asked him to repeat it, then wrote out the melody and lyrics in three or four minutes.  The guitar solos that finish the song were added originally to give Van Zant a chance to rest, as the band was playing several sets per night at clubs at the time.  Soon afterward, the band learned piano-playing roadie Billy Powell had written an introduction to the song; upon hearing it, they included it as the finishing touch and had him formally join as their keyboardist.

Allen Collins's girlfriend, Kathy, whom he later married, asked him, "If I leave here tomorrow, would you still remember me?" Collins noted the question and it eventually became the opening line of "Free Bird." Also, in an interview filmed during a fishing outing on a boat with Gary Rossington, an interviewer asked Ronnie Van Zant what the song meant. Van Zant replied that in essence, that the song is "what it means to be free, in that a bird can fly wherever he wants to go." He further stated that "everyone wants to be free...that's what this country's all about."

The song is dedicated to the memory of Duane Allman by the band in their live shows. During their 1975 performance on The Old Grey Whistle Test, Van Zant dedicated the song to both Allman and Berry Oakley, commenting, "they're both free birds".

During the 1987–1988 Lynyrd Skynyrd Tribute Tour, the band played "Free Bird" as an instrumental. Johnny Van Zant first sang the song on its Lynyrd Skynyrd 1991 Tour in Baton Rouge, where the band had been headed in 1977 when several members were killed in a plane crash.

Reception
Upon the single release, Record World said that the band "sees this country-tinged tune soar to further feather their hit nest."

"Free Bird" is included in The Rock and Roll Hall of Fame's 500 Songs that Shaped Rock and Roll and at number 407 in Rolling Stones 500 Greatest Songs of All Time. In 2009, it was named the 26th best hard rock song of all time by VH1.

Legacy
On Skynyrd's first live album, 1976's One More from the Road, Van Zant can be heard asking the crowd, "What song is it you want to hear?" The calls for "Free Bird" led into a fourteen-and-a-half-minute rendition of the song. It has become something of a humorous tradition for audience members at concerts to shout "Free Bird!" as a request to hear the song, regardless of the performer or style of music. For example, during Nirvana's 1993 MTV Unplugged in New York show, a shout-out for "Free Bird!" eventually resulted in a lyrically slurred, if short, rendition of "Sweet Home Alabama". In 2016, an attendee of a Bob Dylan concert in Berkeley, California, shouted for "Free Bird" to be played, and Dylan and his band unexpectedly obliged.

Notable cover versions
The song has been covered many times. Among the most notable is a version by American dance-pop group Will to Power who created a medley of this song and the 1976 Peter Frampton song "Baby, I Love Your Way" in 1988. Titled "Baby, I Love Your Way/Freebird Medley." The song spent one week at No. 1 on the Billboard Hot 100 chart.

Personnel
Lynyrd Skynyrd (studio version 1973)

 Ronnie Van Zant – vocals
 Allen Collins –  lead and acoustic guitars
 Gary Rossington – rhythm and slide guitars
 Ed King – bass guitar
 Bob Burns – drums
 Billy Powell – piano
 "Roosevelt Gook" (Producer Al Kooper) – organ, Mellotron

Additional personnel (live version 1976)
 Leon Wilkeson – bass guitar
 Steve Gaines – rhythm and lead guitars
 Artimus Pyle – drums

Chart and sales performance
The song has sold 2,111,000 downloads in the digital era, as of 2013.

Weekly charts
Studio version

Live version

Certifications

In popular culture 
 The song has been featured in Forrest Gump, Netflix's House of Cards, America: The Motion Picture, and the Rob Zombie film The Devil's Rejects.
 The song was featured in the 2004 video game Grand Theft Auto: San Andreas, and is heard on the in-game radio station K-DST. The song is playable on the 2010 video game Rock Band 3.
 The song is playable as the final encore of the 2006 video game Guitar Hero II.
 The 2014 film Kingsman: The Secret Service sees the song play during the scene in which Colin Firth's character Harry Hart fights hundreds of people who have become dangerously violent as a result of a SIM card transmission. Director Matthew Vaughn revealed he picked "Free Bird" specifically because its guitar solo was long enough to encompass the whole scene.
 The Netflix film Unbreakable Kimmy Schmidt: Kimmy vs the Reverend has Titus Andromedon, played by Tituss Burgess, singing "Free Bird" in a West Virginia bar. While the character claims to have learned the lyrics because in his Mississippi city "all four years of high school English was the poetry of Lynyrd Skynyrd," the actor had never heard the song before recording it.
 The song was also featured during the ending credits of Shellshock 2: Blood Trails.
 The song was featured during the ending of Willy's Wonderland.
 The song was heard in the 2019 comedy action film Zombieland: Double Tap in the RV shootout scene.

References

1973 songs
1974 singles
Lynyrd Skynyrd songs
Number-one singles in Norway
Joey + Rory songs
Hard rock ballads
1970s ballads
Song recordings produced by Al Kooper
Songs written by Allen Collins
Songs written by Ronnie Van Zant
MCA Records singles